Bates Motel is an American psychological horror drama television series that aired from March 18, 2013, to April 24, 2017. It was developed by Carlton Cuse, Kerry Ehrin, and Anthony Cipriano, and is produced by Universal Television and American Genre for the cable network A&E.

A "contemporary prequel" to Alfred Hitchcock's 1960 film Psycho (based on Robert Bloch's 1959 novel of the same name), it depicts the lives of Norman Bates (Freddie Highmore) and his mother Norma (Vera Farmiga) prior to the events portrayed in the film, albeit in a different fictional town (White Pine Bay, Oregon, as opposed to Fairvale, California) and in a modern-day setting. However, the final season loosely adapts the plot of Psycho.
Max Thieriot and Olivia Cooke both starred as part of the main cast throughout the series' run. After recurring in the first season, Néstor Carbonell was added to the main cast from season two onward.

The series begins in Arizona with the death of Norma's husband, after which Norma purchases the Seafairer motel located in a coastal Oregon town so that she and Norman can start a new life. Subsequent seasons follow Norman as his mental illness becomes dangerous, and Norma as she struggles to protect her son, and those around him, from himself. The series was filmed outside Vancouver in Aldergrove, British Columbia, along with other locations within the Fraser Valley of British Columbia.

A&E chose to skip a pilot of the series, opting to go straight-to-series by ordering a 10-episode first season. Bates Motel is the longest-running original scripted drama series in the channel's history. The series' lead actors, Vera Farmiga and Freddie Highmore, received particular praise for their performances in the series, with the former receiving a Primetime Emmy Award nomination and winning a Saturn Award for Best Actress on Television. Bates Motel also won three People's Choice Awards for Favorite Cable TV Drama, and for Favorite Cable TV Actress (Farmiga) and Actor (Highmore).

Series overview

Season 1

The first season follows Norma and Norman Bates as they buy a motel after Norman's father dies. On one of the first nights of the two owning the motel, the former owner breaks in and rapes Norma. Norman knocks the attacker out, and Norma stabs him to death. She decides it is best not to call the police and to cover up the murder. She and Norman dispose of the body. He complicates the cover-up by keeping a belt that belonged to the victim. When the town sheriff and his deputy notice that a man has gone missing, Norma and Norman must keep them from digging too far.

Season 2

The second season follows the aftermath of Norman's teacher's murder, as her mysterious past comes to light. Meanwhile, Norma finds herself making dangerous decisions in order to keep the motel running and preventing the impending bypass. Bradley's search for her father's killer leads to the extremes, and Dylan learns the disturbing truth about his parentage.

Season 3

The third season focuses on Norman's waning deniability about what is happening to him, and the lengths he will go to, to gain control of his fragile psyche. The dramatic events of last season leave Norma more aware of her son's mental fragility and fearful of what he is capable of. Meanwhile, Sheriff Romero begins to distance himself from the Bates family after he suspects Norma is lying to him about her husband's death.

Season 4

The fourth season follows Norma as she becomes increasingly fearful of Norman, going to great lengths to find him the professional help he needs. This complicates their once unbreakable trust as Norman struggles to maintain his grip on reality. Meanwhile, Sheriff Romero once again finds himself drawn into Norma and Norman's lives. He agrees to marry Norma because his insurance will enable her to place Norman in an expensive psychiatric hospital.

Season 5

The fifth season begins two years after the death of Norma. Publicly happy and well-adjusted, Norman struggles at home, where his blackouts are increasing and "Mother" threatens to take him over completely. Meanwhile, Dylan and Emma find themselves drawn back into Norman's world, and Romero hungers for revenge against his stepson.

Cast and characters

 Vera Farmiga as Norma Louise Bates
 Freddie Highmore as Norman Bates
 Max Thieriot as Dylan Massett
 Olivia Cooke as Emma Decody
 Nicola Peltz as Bradley Martin (seasons 1–2; guest season 3)
 Nestor Carbonell as Sheriff Alex Romero (seasons 2–5; recurring season 1)
 Kenny Johnson as Caleb Calhoun (season 3; recurring seasons 2, 5; guest season 4)

Production

Development

In 2012, A&E was developing a television series titled Bates Motel that would serve as a "contemporary prequel" to the Alfred Hitchcock film Psycho. The first script was written by Anthony Cipriano. Carlton Cuse and Kerry Ehrin joined the project in March as executive producers and head writers. Cuse has cited the drama series Twin Peaks as a key inspiration for Bates Motel: "We pretty much ripped off Twin Peaks... If you wanted to get that confession, the answer is yes. I loved that show. They only did 30 episodes. Kerry [Ehrin] and I thought we'd do the 70 that are missing". A&E gave Bates Motel a straight-to-series order in July. Chris Bacon was hired to score the music for the series in January 2013.

Casting
The casting for the series started in August 2012. Vera Farmiga was the first to be cast in the leading role of Norma Louise Bates. Freddie Highmore was cast as Norman Bates in September. The same month, Max Thieriot was cast as Norman's half-brother, Dylan Massett. Shortly after, Nicola Peltz was cast as Bradley Martin, a possible love interest for Norman. Olivia Cooke was the final main cast member to join the series, in the role of Emma Decody, Norman's best friend. Nestor Carbonell was cast in a recurring role as Sheriff Alex Romero in the first season, but was upgraded to the main cast at the beginning of the second season. Kenny Johnson, who recurred as Norma's brother Caleb Calhoun in the second season, was promoted to a series regular for the third season. Rihanna later appeared in the iconic role of Marion Crane for the fifth and final season.

Filming
A replica of the original Bates Motel set from the film Psycho was built on location at approximately 1054 272nd Street in Aldergrove, British Columbia, where portions of the series were filmed. The original house and motel are located in Universal Studios, Hollywood, Los Angeles. Additional filming for the series took place in multiple areas in Metro Vancouver, including Steveston, Coquitlam, Horseshoe Bay, West Vancouver and Fort Langley. In February 2017, after filming was completed for the series, the Bates Motel exterior set in Aldergrove was demolished.

Reception

Critical response
The first season received positive reviews from critics. On Metacritic, the season holds a score of 66 out of 100, based on 34 critics, indicating "generally favorable reviews". On the review aggregator Rotten Tomatoes, the season has an 84% "certified fresh" rating with an average score of 7.11/10, based on 43 reviews. The site's critical consensus reads, "Bates Motel utilizes mind manipulation and suspenseful fear tactics, on top of consistently sharp character work and wonderfully uncomfortable familial relationships".

The second season also received positive reviews from critics. On Metacritic the season had a score of 67 out of 100, based on 11 critics, indicating "generally favorable reviews". On Rotten Tomatoes, the season has a 90% "certified fresh" rating with an average score of 8.02/10, based on 21 reviews. The site's consensus reads, "Bates Motel reinvents a classic thriller with believable performances and distinguished writing".

The third season of Bates Motel received a score of 72 out of 100 on Metacritic, indicating "generally favorable reviews". Rotten Tomatoes reported a 95% rating from 21 reviews. The site's consensus reads, "Bates Motel further blurs lines around TV's creepiest taboo mother/son relationship, uncomfortably darkening its already fascinating tone".

The fourth season of Bates Motel was met with critical acclaim. Rotten Tomatoes reported a 100% positive rating from 17 reviews. The site's consensus reads, "Bates Motel fulfills its menacing potential in a fourth season that confidently careens toward the mother-son duo's ghastly destiny". Alan Sepinwall of Uproxx considered Bates Motel to have only become a good series midway through season four due to obtaining a better narrative purpose and "tragic grandeur" with the season's latter episodes.

The fifth and final season of Bates Motel received a score of 81 out of 100 on Metacritic, indicating "universal acclaim". Rotten Tomatoes reported a 100% rating from 21 reviews. The site's consensus reads, "Bates Motel'''s final season brings the franchise full circle, with a satisfyingly creepy conclusion to the trials and tribulations of Norman Bates".

Ratings

Awards and nominations

Home media

International broadcast
In Canada, the series airs only on the U.S. network A&E, which is available through most Canadian cable and satellite companies. In Australia, the series premiered on Fox8 on May 26, 2013. In the UK and Ireland, it premiered on Universal Channel on April 2, 2014 and then on BBC One on February 23, 2021. In Jamaica, it premiered on CVM TV on August 11, 2014. In the Middle East, it premiered on OSN First HD in mid-2014. The second season premiered on January 5, 2015. In the Philippines, Bates Motel began airing on Jack TV on August 12, 2013. In South Africa, the series premiered on MNet on June 21, 2013. The series premiered in India on Colors Infinity on November 6, 2015. As of May 2019 Netflix has licensed worldwide distribution for at least 30 countries.

Merchandising

NBCUniversal partnered with Hot Topic, the American retailer of pop culture merchandise, to introduce a collection of clothing and accessories inspired by Bates Motel''. The merchandise, including items such as bathrobes and bloody shower curtains, became available at Hot Topic's website and select stores on March 18, 2014. As of 2018, the merchandise is no longer available through Hot Topic.

See also

References

External links

 
 

 
2010s American drama television series
2010s American horror television series
2010s American mystery television series
2013 American television series debuts
2017 American television series endings
A&E (TV network) original programming
American horror fiction television series
American prequel television series
Child abuse in television
Dissociative identity disorder in television
English-language television shows
Fratricide in fiction
Horror drama television series
Incest in television
Live action television shows based on films
Matricide in fiction
Patricide in fiction
Psychological drama television and other works
Rape in television
Saturn Award-winning television series
Serial drama television series
Serial killers in television
Television series about dysfunctional families
Television about mental health
Television series about fictional serial killers
Television series by Universal Television
Television series created by Carlton Cuse
Television series reboots
Television shows directed by Steph Green
Television shows filmed in British Columbia
Television shows set in Oregon
Works set in motels